Tugay or Tugai may refer to:

People
Tugay (name), list of people with the name

Other
 Tugay, forest ecosystem
 Tuğay, Azerbaijan village

See also
 Turgay
Tugai (disambiguation)